Hope Street is the eighth studio album recorded by Stiff Little Fingers, released in 1999. The album was released as a 2-disc set however each set was different in the UK and U.S. with different track listing order on the Hope Street album and a greatest hits cd for the UK release and live greatest hits for the U.S. release.

Track listing
 UK Version
 Disc One Hope Street

"Hope Street" (Burns) – 3:33
"Tantalise" (Burns) – 3:18
"What Does It Take" (Burns) – 4:49 
"Last Train from the Wasteland" – 4:52
"All the Rest" (Burns, Grantley) – 3:16 
"Honeyed Words" (Burns) – 3:34 
"You Can Get It (If You Really Want It)" – 3:08
"Bulletproof" (Burns) – 4:31
"Be Seeing You" (Burns, Grantley) – 2:56
"Half a Life Away" (Burns, McCallum) – 4:07
"No Faith" (Burns) – 3:47
"All I Need" (Burns, Grantley) – 5:04

 Disc Two And Best of All...

Suspect Device
Alternative Ulster
Barbed Wire Love
Johnny Was
At the Edge
Fly the Flag
Tin Soldiers
Roots, Radics, Rockers & Reggae
Safe As Houses
Piccadilly Circus
Falling Down
Love of the Common People
Is that What You Fought the War For?

 US Version
 Disc One Hope Street
"Bulletproof" (Burns) – 4:31
"All I Need" (Burns, Grantley) – 5:04
"Be Seeing You" (Burns, Grantley) – 2:56
"You Can Get It (If You Really Want It)" – 3:08
"Half a Life Away" (Burns, McCallum) – 4:07
"No Faith" (Burns) – 3:47
"Tantalise" (Burns) – 3:18
"Hope Street" (Burns) – 3:33
"Last Train from the Wasteland" – 4:52
"What Does It Take" (Burns) – 4:49 
"All the Rest" (Burns, Grantley) – 3:16 
"Honeyed Words" (Burns) – 3:34

 Disc Two Greatest Hits Live
"Suspect Device [live]" (Ogilvie, Stiff Little Fingers) – 2:30 
"Alternative Ulster [live]" (Burns, Ogilvie) – 3:19 
"Johnny Was [live]" (Marley) – 7:44 
"At the Edge [live]" (Burns) – 3:03 
"Fly the Flag [live]" (Burns, Ogilvie) – 3:57 
"Tin Soldiers [live]" (Burns, Ogilvie) – 4:42 
"Roots, Radicals, Rockers and Reggae [live]" (Stiff Little Fingers) – 3:39 
"Silver Lining [live]" (Burns, Ogilvie) – 3:22 
"Wasted Life [live]" (Burns) – 2:58 
"No Laughing Matter [live]" (Burns) – 3:02

Personnel
 Jake Burns – Vocals, guitar
 Ian McCallum – guitar, Vocals
 Bruce Foxton – bass guitar, Vocals
 Steve Grantley – drums, Vocals

References

1999 albums
Stiff Little Fingers albums